Hernán D'Arcangelo (born November 11, 1980 in Córdoba) is a professional squash player who represents Argentina. He reached a career-high world ranking of World No. 98 in May 2013. Hernán won the bronze medal at the 2011 Pan American Games.  Her sister is Celeste D'Arcangelo, an Argentine rhythmic gymnast who has qualified for the YOG Buenos Aires 2018.

References

External links 
 
 

1980 births
Living people
Argentine male squash players
Pan American Games bronze medalists for Argentina
Pan American Games medalists in squash
South American Games silver medalists for Argentina
South American Games bronze medalists for Argentina
South American Games medalists in squash
Squash players at the 2011 Pan American Games
Competitors at the 2010 South American Games
Medalists at the 2011 Pan American Games